Andrei Ivanovici Kliushnikov, real name Vasilii Surov (commonly known as Nenin or Ninin; 1892-1924), was a Soviet communist who took a very important role in the Tatarbunary Uprising.

Born in the village of Kuki (Sapojok raion, Ryazan gubernia, part of Russian Empire), he moved to Petrograd and worked at the Putilov plant. After some time obtain qualification as a military medical assistant. During the First World War he provided medical care on the Romanian Front. After the World War got involved in the Bolshevik movement and on September 15, 1924, he led a military uprising in and around the town of Tatarbunary proclaiming the Moldavian Soviet Republic as part of the Ukraine SSR but eventually died during fighting with the Romanian Army.

References 

Alexandru V. Boldur, Imperialismul sovietic și România, p. 208

Ludmila Rotari, Miscarea Subversiva din Basarabia 1918–1924, editura Enciclopedica, 2004, p. 258

Bolsheviks
Comintern people
People from Ryazan
Soviet communists
1892 births
1924 deaths